Naawan, officially the Municipality of Naawan, is a fourth class municipality in the province of Misamis Oriental, Philippines. The population of the town is estimated to be 22,444 according to the 2020 census.

Naawan has earned a national reputation as one of the most beautiful towns in the country, as well as being named the cleanest town in the Philippines in 2008.

In 1957, the barrio of Naawan, then part of Initao, was incorporated into the town of Naawan. The process for incorporating Naawan, from Initao was started in 1956.

Geography

Barangays
Naawan is politically subdivided into ten barangays.
 Don Pedro
 Linangkayan
 Lubilan
 Mapulog
 Maputi
 Mat-i
 Patag
 Poblacion
 Tagbalogo
 Tuboran

Education
Located in the town of Naawan is the Mindanao State University at Naawan campus, a unit of the Mindanao State University System. MSU-Naawan was established in the 1960s and 1970s as a scientific field laboratory for scientific research in the field along with the university's main campus in Marawi City, Lanao del Sur. With the involvement of Mindanao State University's College of Fisheries, the School of Marine Fisheries Technology graduated its first batch of university graduates in 1985. As an autonomous external campus and a distinct unit of the university system, the institute was known as the MSU-Institute of Fisheries Research & Development. It directly supervised the 'original' Naawan High School (the MSU-Naawan Fisheries High School after it was renamed the MSU-Naawan Fisheries High School).
When the Naawan Central School's children's choir won first prize in the NAMCYA Children's Choir Finals at the Cultural Center of the Philippines in 1987, the school made a mark on the national stage.

Demographics

Economy

Climate

References

External links
 [ Philippine Standard Geographic Code]
 

Municipalities of Misamis Oriental